The 2004 Citywest Irish Masters was a professional ranking snooker tournament that took place between 21 and 28 March 2004 at the Citywest Hotel in Dublin, Republic of Ireland.

Ronnie O'Sullivan was the defending champion, however he lost 2–6 to eventual champion Peter Ebdon in the quarter-finals.

Peter Ebdon won the title by defeating Mark King 10–7 in the final.

Prize fund
The breakdown of prize money for this year is shown below:

Winner: £48,000
Runner-up: £24,000
Semi-final: £12,000
Quarter-final: £7,900
Last 16: £6,900
Last 32: £5,500
Last 48: £2,900
Last 64: £2,100

Last 80: £1,600
Last 96: £1,050
Stage one highest break: £1,800
Stage two highest break: £5,000
Stage one maximum break: £5,000
Stage two maximum break: £20,000
Total: £400,000

Main draw

Final

Qualifying
Qualifying for the tournament took place between 5–10 January 2004 at Pontin's in Prestatyn, Wales.
Round 1 – Best of 9 frames

 Andrew Higginson 3–5 Mehmet Husnu 

 Adrian Gunnell 4–5 Paul Sweeny 

 David Gilbert 2–5 Supoj Saenla 

 Kristján Helgason w/d–w/o Kurt Maflin 

 Luke Fisher 3–5 Michael Rhodes 

 Ryan Day 5–4 Philip Williams 

 Jason Prince 5–3 Ian Brumby 

 Ricky Walden 4–5 Scott MacKenzie 

 Craig Butler 4–5 Ding Junhui 

 Wayne Brown 5–2 Steve Mifsud 

 Billy Snaddon 5–0 Gary Thomson 

 Kwan Poomjang 3–5 Ian Preece 

 Atthasit Mahitthi w/o–w/d Alain Robidoux 

 Martin Dziewialtowski 2–5 Adrian Rosa 

 Terry Murphy w/d–w/o Luke Simmonds 

 Jamie Cope 5–4 Stuart Mann 

 Matthew Couch 5–1 Ian Sargeant 

 Munraj Pal 5–3 Andy Neck 

 Peter Lines 3–5 Darryn Walker 

 Leo Fernandez 4–5 Tom Ford 

 Colm Gilcreest 5–2 Garry Hardiman 

 Paul Wykes 2–5 Neil Robertson 

 Lee Walker 5–2 Michael Wild 

 Simon Bedford 5–0 Carlo Giagnacovo 

 Rory McLeod 5–0 James Leadbetter 

 Andrew Norman 5–2 Stephen Croft 

 Jason Ferguson 0–5 Steven Bennie 

 Johl Younger 3–5 Joe Delaney 

 Paul Davies 5–2 Liu Song 

 Bradley Jones 5–1 Joe Meara 

 Tony Jones 0–5 Martin Gould 

 Joe Johnson w/d–w/o Chris Melling

Century breaks

Qualifying stage centuries

 141  Barry Pinches
 141  Michael Holt
 138  Shaun Murphy
 135, 104  Neil Robertson
 134, 128, 118, 113  Jamie Cope
 132, 112, 107, 105  Ryan Day
 128  Andy Hicks
 120  Bradley Jones
 118, 100  Fergal O'Brien

 117, 107  Ding Junhui
 115  Lee Walker
 115  Michael Judge
 114, 100  Patrick Wallace
 112  Paul Sweeny
 111  Nigel Bond
 106  Stephen Maguire
 105  Martin Gould
 105  Dominic Dale

Televised stage centuries

 138, 137  Mark King
 136, 131, 125, 107  Peter Ebdon
 134, 111, 102   Quinten Hann
 118  Nigel Bond
 116  Paul Hunter
 116  David Gray

 114, 100, 100  Anthony Hamilton
 111  John Higgins
 106  Ronnie O'Sullivan
 106  Mark Williams
 105  Joe Perry
 101  Jimmy White

References

2004
Irish Masters
Masters
Irish Masters
Snooker ranking tournaments